Baghdad Soldiers, working together with Iraqi Army troops, discovered two caches totaling approximately 700 lbs. of homemade explosives in the early morning hours of 15 July 2007 in Operation Purple Haze.

Operation Details
The 3rd Battalion, 5th Brigade, 6th Iraqi Army Division and Soldiers from 1st Battalion, 64th Armor Regiment made the cache finds during Operation Purple Haze, part of an ongoing effort to establish security in the western Baghdad Jamiya'a neighborhood.

The homemade explosives, 14 50-lb. bags, were found in an abandoned house along with ball bearings and detonation cord.  An explosive ordnance disposal unit conducted a controlled detonation of the one bag of homemade explosives at the site of the discovery.  The bag was torn and the explosives were leaking, making the bag unsafe for transportation.  All other items in the cache were removed from the house prior to demolition.

In a separate raid during the same operation, a smaller cache of munitions and weapons was discovered.  Two machine guns, one AK-47 assault rifle and a variety of knives, grenades and other small explosives were uncovered in a second abandoned home in the neighborhood.

Participating Units

American Units
1st Battalion, 64th Armor Regiment

Iraqi Units
Battalion, 5th Brigade, 6th Iraqi Army Division

See also

War related Articles
Iraq War
List of coalition military operations of the Iraq War

Iraq Related Articles
Iraq
History of Iraq

Terrorism, Bombings and Insurgency Related
Terrorism
Iraq Insurgency
Suicide bombings in Iraq since 2003
Bombings and terrorist attacks of the Iraq War
Terrorist attacks of the Iraq War

Casualties
United States casualties of war
Post-traumatic stress disorder
Iraq Body Count project
Violence against academics in post-invasion Iraq

References

Purple Haze

Military operations of the Iraq War involving the United States
Military operations of the Iraq War involving Iraq
Military operations of the Iraq War in 2007
Iraqi insurgency (2003–2011)